This is a list of megaprojects, which may be defined as:
 Projects that cost more than US$1 billion and attract a large amount of public attention because of substantial impacts on communities, the natural and built environment, and budgets.
 Projects that are "initiatives that are physical, very expensive, and public".

Some examples include bridges, tunnels, highways, railways, airports, seaports, power plants, dams, wastewater projects, Special Economic Zones (SEZ), oil and natural gas extraction projects, public buildings, information technology systems, aerospace projects, and weapons systems. This list identifies a wide variety of examples of major historic and contemporary projects that meet one or both megaproject criteria identified above.

Legend

Aerospace projects

 Airbus A380, a double-deck, wide-body, four-engine jet airliner manufactured by Airbus.
 Antonov An-225 was the longest and heaviest aircraft in service, until it was destroyed by Russia during the 2022 Russian invasion of Ukraine. Only one unit was ever completed.
 Boeing B-29 Superfortress, the first nuclear bomber, which cost 50% more than the development of the bombs in the Manhattan Project.
 Boeing B-52 Stratofortress, with six decades of service as a strategic nuclear bomber, it is one of the largest military aircraft ever built. Every other bomber produced in the US after the B-52 have been megaprojects; however, it has not been replaced nor will it be in the foreseeable future.
 Boeing 2707 and Lockheed L-2000 supersonic aircraft projects, initiated in 1963 via a US government-funded competition to build the United States' first Supersonic Transport (SST), prototypes never built, ultimately canceled due to political, environmental and economic reasons in 1971.
 Boeing 747, a wide-body commercial airliner first produced in 1970, often referred to by the nickname Jumbo Jet, is among the world's most recognizable aircraft with uses for long-distance passenger transport, cargo, the US President's official shuttle plane, and as NASA's Shuttle Carrier Aircraft.
 Boeing 787, made in the United States with local and globally sourced parts, is the first major aircraft to be made largely out of composite materials.
 Concorde, a supersonic passenger airliner, a product of an Anglo-French government treaty that combined the manufacturing efforts of Aérospatiale and the British Aircraft Corporation, first flown in 1969, Concorde entered service in 1976 and continued commercial flights for twenty-seven years.
 Convair B-58 Hustler, an all-weather, high altitude supersonic bomber with a fixed delta wing and 4 engines. The Hustler was operational from 1960 to 1970 in the US Air Force's Strategic Air Command for the deployment of up to 5 gravity nuclear weapons.
 Lockheed C-5 Galaxy was the largest and heaviest aircraft of any kind for over a decade (1970 to 1982). This military cargo plane was the first development program with a billion dollar cost overrun.
 F-22 Raptor, a single seat, twin-engine fifth-generation fighter manufactured by Lockheed Martin that uses stealth technology.
 F-35 Lightning II, a single seat, single engine, all-weather stealth multirole combat aircraft that is intended to perform both air superiority and strike missions.
 Sukhoi Su-57/HAL FGFA, two variants of fifth-generation stealth fighters jointly being developed by Sukhoi and Hindustan Aeronautics Limited for the Russian and the Indian Air Forces as a combined effort by Russia and India.
 Northrop Grumman B-2 Spirit, also known as the Stealth Bomber, a US heavy bomber with "low observable" stealth. Total program cost including development, engineering, and testing averaged $2.1 billion per aircraft in 1997.
 KH-11 reconnaissance satellite, manufactured by Lockheed Corporation and launched between 1976 and 1990.
 Rockwell B-1 Lancer, a supersonic bomber with a variable-sweep wing built in the 1980s as a strategic bomber. It has since acquired conventional and multi-role capabilities.
 Tupolev Tu-144, the first supersonic transport aircraft, made by the Russian aircraft company Tupolev, first flown on 31 December 1968 and entered service on 26 December 1975.
 Tupolev Tu-160, the world's largest and heaviest combat aircraft, the world's largest supersonic aircraft, and the largest variable-sweep aircraft ever built. (The North American XB-70 Valkyrie had a higher empty weight and maximum speed but never entered production.)

Disaster cleanup

While most megaprojects are planned and undertaken with careful forethought, some are undertaken out of necessity after a natural disaster occurs. There have also been a few human-made disasters.
 The Chernobyl New Safe Confinement was built to enclose the #4 reactor that was destroyed in the Chernobyl disaster of 1986 (completed summer 2019)
 The Fukushima disaster cleanup is ongoing, and includes the removal of spent nuclear fuel stored at the site of the 2011 Fukushima Daiichi nuclear disaster.
 Cleaning up the Deepwater Horizon oil spill, Exxon Valdez oil spill, and AZF chemical factory explosion were megaprojects.
 Many hurricanes and typhoons have caused extensive damage and required large cleanup efforts, the largest of which included projects that targeted the damaged infrastructure. The list of costliest Atlantic hurricanes covers the ones in the Atlantic region, including Hurricane Katrina from 2005.
 Many earthquakes (and resultant tsunamis) have caused enough damage to infrastructure that enormous projects were undertaken. The 1994 Northridge earthquake, the 2004 Indian Ocean earthquake and tsunami, and the 2011 Tōhoku earthquake and tsunami are some of the most notorious and recent events that led to a megaproject.
 Flooding is the cause of many disasters. Some have caused enough damage that a megaproject would be used to recover. The Great Mississippi Flood of 1927 and the 2011 Mississippi River floods are examples.
 The cleanup and recovery from the 1980 eruption of Mount St. Helens in rural Washington state was of megaproject proportions.
 Major restoration was necessary after the destruction caused by World War I and II, some of which was paid for by German reparations for World War I and for World War II.

Energy projects

 Bataan Nuclear Power Plant, an inactive nuclear power plant in Morong, Bataan in the Philippines. It was completed in 1984 with a cost of over US$2.3 billion, around 7 percent of the country's GDP at the time and equivalent to US$5.8 billion in 2022. The plant never opened due to political change and safety issues, and its planned reactivation has become the focal point of the Anti-nuclear movement in the Philippines.
 Boundary Dam Power Station, the world's first large-scale, coal-fired carbon capture and storage plant.
 Olkiluoto 3, a nuclear power-plant in Eurajoki, Finland, completed in September 2022.
 Kemper Project, or Kemper County Energy Facility, is the world's first construction attempt of an Integrated Gasification Combined Cycle plant with Carbon Capture & Sequestration. However, after significant delays and cost overruns, the gasification process is currently suspended and the power plant runs just on regular natural gas.
 The Panamanian Natural Gas electric power plant is a project with an investment of 1.15 billion US dollars located in Colon province. It is also meant as a port for supplying Natural Gas to other Central American countries.
 Tres Amigas SuperStation, an interconnection to connect the Eastern Interconnection to the Western Interconnection and the Texas Interconnection. This will effectively connect nearly all electrical grids in North America.
 Three Gorges Dam, the largest hydro-electric facility in the world, located on the Yangtze River in Hubei Province, China.
 Virgil C. Summer Nuclear Generating Station, was a project to construct some of the first new nuclear units in the United States in over 30 years, at an existing nuclear power plant in Jenkinsville, South Carolina. The project was cancelled and all work stopped in July 2017.
 Vogtle Electric Generating Plant, is a project to construct two new nuclear units at an existing nuclear power plant in Waynesboro, Georgia.
 Australia-Asia Power Link, a proposed electricity infrastructure project that is planned to include the world's largest solar plant, the world's largest battery, and the world's longest submarine power cable. Estimates place construction costs at A$30 Billion.

Science projects

Research and development efforts 

 Copernicus (1998), European Union's satellite constellation program for global monitoring – €6.8 billion (2020)
 COVID-19 vaccine development (2020–2023), global efforts to develop a vaccine against the SARS-CoV-2 virus – $93 billion (2021)
 Human Genome Project (1990–2003), U.S.-led international effort to sequence the human genome – $5 billion (2021 adj.)
 Materials Genome Initiative (2011), U.S. government R&D effort to discover next-generation materials
 Manhattan Project (1942–1946), U.S. government effort to produce the first nuclear bombs – $22.8 billion (2021 adj.)

Physics and Astronomy infrastructure 
 Atacama Large Millimeter Array
 Deep Underground Neutrino Experiment and the Long Baseline Neutrino Facility, proposed 2014, est. start date for phase I ($3B) is 2032. 
 Electron-ion collider (under construction)
 Envisat, an Earth observation satellite of European Space Agency (2002–2012)
 European Spallation Source, strongest ever spallation source for advanced and new material research development.
 European X-ray free electron laser, used for material research (since 2017).
 Extreme Light Infrastructure, European centers for the most intense lasers (under construction)
 Extremely Large Telescope, world's largest optical to mid infrared telescope (under construction)
 Facility for Antiproton and Ion Research, in Germany (2012–)
 Five hundred meter Aperture Spherical Telescope (FAST), the world's largest static/semi-static radio telescope measuring 500 meters across located in Guizhou Province, People's Republic of China.
 Giant Magellan Telescope, a large ground-based optical and near infrared telescope (under construction)
 India-based Neutrino Observatory (under construction)
 ITER (2007-2035), international effort to build the world's largest nuclear fusion reactor in France (started 2013; planned 2025) – est. costs up to $65 billion
 Large Hadron Collider, a 13 TeV CERN particle accelerator, in Switzerland and France (2000–)
 Advanced LIGO, a large-scale physics experiment and observatory to measure gravitational waves, with total cost more than US$1 billion.
 MYRRHA, prototype of an accelerator-driven system to transmute nuclear waste
 National Ignition Facility, United States nuclear fusion project (1997–)
 Ocean Networks Canada cabled observatories. Largest underwater observatories, providing 24/7 access to hundreds of instruments in the Pacific Ocean and the Salish Sea (2005–)
 Proton Improvement Project, "PIP II" (under construction), estimated cost in 2022 is $1.28B.  
 Square Kilometre Array in South Africa and Australia (under construction)
 Superconducting Super Collider, canceled 40 TeV particle accelerator in Texas (1991–1993)
 Tevatron 1 TeV particle accelerator, in the United States (1983–2011)
 Thirty Meter Telescope, a large optical and near infrared telescope (under construction)
 Very Large Array, a radio astronomy observatory in the US
 Wendelstein 7-X, an experimental stellarator (nuclear fusion reactor) in Greifswald, Germany

Spacecraft
 Advanced Telescope for High Energy Astrophysics, a planned X-ray telescope being developed by ESA which will launch in 2035.
 Cassini–Huygens, a joint NASA/ESA/ASI spacecraft mission studying the planet Saturn and its many natural satellites since 2004. The total cost of this project is about $3.26 billion.
 Chandrayaan program, a lunar exploration program of ISRO of India.
 Chang'e 1 to Chang'e 6, a series of lunar exploration spacecraft sent by People's Republic of China for their lunar exploration program, equipped with landers, orbiters and rover. It will for the first time in history explore the 'dark-side' of the Moon.
 Compass navigation system, an independent system of satellite navigation by People's Republic of China (Est. 2015–2017)
 Europa Clipper, an interplanetary mission in development by NASA to study Jupiter's moon Europa. (2022–)
 Gaia spacecraft, an ESA mission to create a 3D map of local Milky Way. ($1 billion, since 2013)
 Galileo Navigation Satellite System, a European Union and European Space Agency global satellite navigation system, €5 billion (since 2016)
 Galileo spacecraft, a mission to Jupiter (1989–2003) ($1.5 billion as 2003.)
 Global Positioning System, a global satellite navigation system created by the United States Department of Defense, $21.7 billion or more (since 1973)
 GLONASS, the Russian global navigation satellite system (since 1982)
 Herschel Space Observatory, ESA space observatory sensitive to the far infrared and submillimetre bands
 Hubble Space Telescope, an optical telescope orbiting in low Earth orbit, $10 billion (1978–)
 International Space Station, multinational space station in low Earth orbit (1998–), 150bn in 2010 dollars
 James Webb Space Telescope (launched in 2021 cost $8.8 billion in 2013)
 Juno spacecraft, a NASA New Frontiers mission to the planet Jupiter (2011– )
 Jupiter Icy Moon Explorer, a planned mission to Jupiter (Est. 2022)
 Laser Interferometer Space Antenna, an L3 class mission by ESA designed to detect and accurately measure gravitational waves.
 Lunokhod ("Moonwalker"), was a series of Soviet robotic lunar rovers designed to land on the Moon between 1969 and 1977. Lunokhod 1 was the first roving remote-controlled robot to land on another world.
 Mars program was a series of uncrewed spacecraft launched by the Soviet Union between 1960 and 1973. The spacecraft were intended to explore Mars, and included flyby probes, landers and orbiters. 
 Mars Science Laboratory (with Curiosity rover), $2.5 billion
 Mars 2020, a Mars rover mission by NASA's Mars Exploration Program, launched 30 July 2020.
 Mir, Russian space station in low Earth orbit (1986–2001).
 Nancy Grace Roman Space Telescope, a planned wide field infrared space telescope by NASA.
 NAVIC, the Indian equivalent of GPS developed by ISRO.
 Orion spacecraft, a spacecraft built by Lockheed Martin for NASA.
 Planck spacecraft, an ESA's mission to measure the cosmic microwave background.
 Venera (Venus) series space probes were developed by the Soviet Union between 1961 and 1984 to gather data from Venus. Venera 7 became the first spacecraft to land on Venus and first to transmit data from there back to Earth.
 Sutherland Spaceport, a planned space port in the north of Scotland

Other spaceflight projects
 Alpha Magnetic Spectrometer, a $2 billion particle physics experiment module that is mounted on the International Space Station since 2011
 Apollo program (1960–1975), as a centerpiece of the US Space Program, culminated in crewed exploratory missions to the Moon, $203.4 billion in 2015 dollars
 Ariane, a family of European launch vehicles; the most recent development is Ariane 6
 Avatar RLV, Indian version of the Space Shuttle, being developed by the DRDO and ISRO.
 Baikonur Cosmodrome is the world's first and largest operational space launch facility. It was originally built by the Soviet Union in the late 1950s as the base of operations for the Soviet space program.
 Buran program, canceled Soviet version of the Space Shuttle (1980–1993)
 Constellation program, canceled planned moon landing spacecraft and space shuttle replacement, part lives on as future Crew Escape Vehicle for ISS (2005–2010)
 SpaceX Mars transportation infrastructure, a privately funded spaceflight system capable of enabling human settlements on Mars (2016– )
 Kennedy Space Center, the main spaceport for US crewed space flight, located in Cape Canaveral, Florida.
 Shenzhou program, Chinese human spaceflight program (since 1992)
 Soyuz program, Soviet/Russian human spaceflight program (since 1966)
 Soviet Moonshot, canceled Moon landing program (1962–1969)
 Space Launch System, an American Space Shuttle-derived heavy expendable launch vehicle (2011–)
 Space Shuttle program (1972–2011), low Earth orbiters designed as crewed cargo vessels that could be reused after each spaceflight and landed like a glider, $203.6 billion in 2015 dollars
 Vostochny Cosmodrome ("Eastern Spaceport") is a Russian spaceport on the 51st parallel north in the Amur Oblast, in the Russian Far East.
 Vostok program, Soviet program to put the first man in space (1959–1963)

Sports and culture projects

Every Olympic Games and FIFA World Cup in the latter part of the twentieth century and entering into the 21st century has cost more than $1 billion in arenas, hotels etc., usually several billions.

Indian Sports Megaprojects

Olympic Games 

Note: Some values are not shown on the other list due to research, which needs verification. The listed costs were converted to US Dollars at the time of the games.

FIFA World Cup

Major League Baseball (MLB)

National Basketball Association (NBA)

National Football League (NFL)

National Hockey League (NHL)

Chinese megaprojects

UK megaprojects

Roads and transport infrastructure

Ground transportation systems like roads, tunnels, bridges, terminals, railways, and mass transit systems are often megaprojects. Numerous large airports and terminals used for airborne passenger and cargo transportation are built as megaprojects.

Africa

West Africa
African Union

 Great Green Wall of Sahara

Nigeria

Asia

East Asia

People's Republic of China

Japan

South Korea

South Asia

Bangladesh

India

Pakistan

Southeast Asia

Indonesia

Malaysia

Philippines

Singapore

Thailand

Vietnam

Middle East

Bahrain

Iran

Israel

Kuwait

Qatar

Saudi Arabia

United Arab Emirates

Central America

Costa Rica

Panama

Europe

Croatia

Serbia-North Macedonia-Greece

Serbia-Hungary

Serbia

European Union (As a whole)

Slovenia

Czech Republic

France

Germany

Greece

Montenegro

Norway

Poland

Portugal

Switzerland

United Kingdom

North America

Canada

Mexico

United States

Oceania

Australia

Planned cities and urban renewal projects

Africa

Eastern Africa

Kenya

Northern Africa

Egypt

Southern Africa

South Africa

Western Africa

Nigeria

Asia

East Asia

China

Japan

South Asia

India

Pakistan

Sri Lanka

Southeast Asia

Indonesia

Malaysia

Philippines

Middle East

Azerbaijan

Iran

Iraq

Jordan

Kuwait

Qatar

Saudi Arabia

United Arab Emirates

Eurasia

Republic of Turkey (Europe West and Asia East of the Bosphorus, the Sea of Marmara, and the Dardanelles)

Russia (Europe West and Asia East of the Ural Mountains)

Europe

France

Germany

Norway

Romania

Spain

Sweden

United Kingdom

North America

Canada

Mexico

United States

Oceania

Australia

New Zealand

South America

Brazil

Colombia

Water-related

Ports, waterways, canals, and locks for Passenger Ships and Cargo Ships carrying passengers and cargo from country to country and islands nations are built as megaprojects

Africa

Eastern Africa

Ethiopia

Kenya

Tanzania

Northern Africa

Egypt

Western Africa

Nigeria

Asia

East Asia

China

Japan

South Asia

Sri Lanka

Pakistan

India
Sagarmala Project- The Sagarmala Programme is an initiative by the government of India to enhance the performance of the country's logistics sector. The programme envisages unlocking the potential of waterways and the coastline to minimize infrastructural investments required to meet these targets.[1][2] It entails investing Rs. 8.5 trillion (2018) to set up new mega ports, modernizing India's existing ports, developing of 14 Coastal Economic Zones (CEZs) and Coastal Economic Units, enhancing port connectivity via road, rail, multi-modal logistics parks, pipelines & waterways and promoting coastal community development, with the aim of boosting merchandise exports by US$110 billion and generating around 10,000,000 direct and indirect jobs.
Six megaports are planned in Sagarmala project.

Middle East

Palestine

United Arab Emirates

Caribbean

Cuba

Central America

Nicaragua

Panama

Europe

Denmark

Netherlands

Norway

North America

Canada

Mexico

United States

South America

Brazil

See also
 List of most expensive U.S. public works projects

References

External links
 Megaprojects in Dubai

Lists of most expensive things
Megaprojects
Infrastructure-related lists